Julio Pinedo (born 19 February 1942) is the ceremonial king of the Afro-Bolivian community of the Nor Yungas province, crowned in 1992, forty years after the death of the previous king, his grandfather Bonifacio Pinedo. His position gained official recognition in 2007 when he was sworn in by the prefect of La Paz.

Web site

References

Afro-Bolivian people
Living people
1953 births
People from La Paz Department (Bolivia)
Bolivian politicians